Route 119 is a limited-access North/South provincial highway in the Canadian province of New Brunswick. The road runs from Route 1 (The Mackay Highway) to the Gondola Point Ferry. The road has a length of approximately 6 kilometres, and only services Quispamsis. The road is also called Gondola Point Arterial.

History

The Gondola Point Arterial was constructed in 1986.

Intersecting routes
 Route 100 in Quispamsis

River crossings
 None

Communities along the Route
Quispamsis

See also
List of New Brunswick provincial highways

References

119
119